Mohamed Ali Amri (born 16 May 1996) is a Tunisian football midfielder who as of 2018 plays for US Monastir.

References

1996 births
Living people
Tunisian footballers
CS Hammam-Lif players
ES Métlaoui players
ES Zarzis players
CO Médenine players
US Monastir (football) players
Association football midfielders
Tunisian Ligue Professionnelle 1 players